The arrondissement of Châlons-en-Champagne is an arrondissement of France in the Marne department in the Grand Est region. It has 150 communes.

Composition

The communes of the arrondissement of Châlons-en-Champagne, and their INSEE codes, are:
 
 Aigny (51003)
 Argers (51015)
 Aulnay-sur-Marne (51023)
 Auve (51027)
 Baconnes (51031)
 Belval-en-Argonne (51047)
 Berzieux (51053)
 Binarville (51062)
 Bouy (51078)
 Braux-Sainte-Cohière (51082)
 Braux-Saint-Remy (51083)
 Breuvery-sur-Coole (51087)
 Bussy-le-Château (51097)
 Bussy-Lettrée (51099)
 Cernay-en-Dormois (51104)
 Cernon (51106)
 Châlons-en-Champagne (51108)
 Champigneul-Champagne (51117)
 La Chapelle-Felcourt (51126)
 Les Charmontois (51132)
 Le Châtelier (51133)
 Châtrices (51138)
 Chaudefontaine (51139)
 Le Chemin (51143)
 Cheniers (51146)
 La Cheppe (51147)
 Cheppes-la-Prairie (51148)
 Chepy (51149)
 Cherville (51150)
 Compertrix (51160)
 Condé-sur-Marne (51161)
 Contault (51166)
 Coolus (51168)
 Coupetz (51178)
 Coupéville (51179)
 Courtémont (51191)
 Courtisols (51193)
 La Croix-en-Champagne (51197)
 Cuperly (51203)
 Dampierre-au-Temple (51205)
 Dampierre-le-Château (51206)
 Dampierre-sur-Moivre (51208)
 Dommartin-Dampierre (51211)
 Dommartin-Lettrée (51212)
 Dommartin-sous-Hans (51213)
 Dommartin-Varimont (51214)
 Éclaires (51222)
 Écury-sur-Coole (51227)
 Élise-Daucourt (51228)
 Épense (51229)
 L'Épine (51231)
 Fagnières (51242)
 Faux-Vésigneul (51244)
 Florent-en-Argonne (51253)
 Fontaine-en-Dormois (51255)
 Francheville (51259)
 Le Fresne (51260)
 Givry-en-Argonne (51272)
 Gizaucourt (51274)
 Les Grandes-Loges (51278)
 Gratreuil (51280)
 Hans (51283)
 Haussimont (51285)
 Herpont (51292)
 Isse (51301)
 Jâlons (51303)
 Jonchery-sur-Suippe (51307)
 Juvigny (51312)
 Laval-sur-Tourbe (51317)
 Lenharrée (51319)
 Livry-Louvercy (51326)
 Maffrécourt (51336)
 Mairy-sur-Marne (51339)
 Malmy (51341)
 Marson (51354)
 Massiges (51355)
 Matougues (51357)
 Minaucourt-le-Mesnil-lès-Hurlus (51368)
 Moiremont (51370)
 Moivre (51371)
 Moncetz-Longevas (51372)
 Montépreux (51377)
 Mourmelon-le-Grand (51388)
 Mourmelon-le-Petit (51389)
 La Neuville-au-Pont (51399)
 La Neuville-aux-Bois (51397)
 Noirlieu (51404)
 Nuisement-sur-Coole (51409)
 Omey (51415)
 Passavant-en-Argonne (51424)
 Pogny (51436)
 Poix (51438)
 Rapsécourt (51452)
 Recy (51453)
 Remicourt (51456)
 Rouvroy-Ripont (51470)
 Sainte-Marie-à-Py (51501)
 Sainte-Menehould (51507)
 Saint-Étienne-au-Temple (51476)
 Saint-Germain-la-Ville (51482)
 Saint-Gibrien (51483)
 Saint-Hilaire-au-Temple (51485)
 Saint-Hilaire-le-Grand (51486)
 Saint-Jean-sur-Moivre (51490)
 Saint-Jean-sur-Tourbe (51491)
 Saint-Mard-sur-Auve (51498)
 Saint-Mard-sur-le-Mont (51500)
 Saint-Martin-aux-Champs (51502)
 Saint-Martin-sur-le-Pré (51504)
 Saint-Memmie (51506)
 Saint-Pierre (51509)
 Saint-Quentin-sur-Coole (51512)
 Saint-Remy-sur-Bussy (51515)
 Saint-Thomas-en-Argonne (51519)
 Sarry (51525)
 Servon-Melzicourt (51533)
 Sivry-Ante (51537)
 Sogny-aux-Moulins (51538)
 Somme-Bionne (51543)
 Sommepy-Tahure (51544)
 Sommesous (51545)
 Somme-Suippe (51546)
 Somme-Tourbe (51547)
 Somme-Vesle (51548)
 Somme-Yèvre (51549)
 Souain-Perthes-lès-Hurlus (51553)
 Soudé (51555)
 Soudron (51556)
 Suippes (51559)
 Thibie (51566)
 Tilloy-et-Bellay (51572)
 Togny-aux-Bœufs (51574)
 Vadenay (51587)
 Valmy (51588)
 Vassimont-et-Chapelaine (51594)
 Vatry (51595)
 Verrières (51610)
 Vésigneul-sur-Marne (51616)
 La Veuve (51617)
 Le Vieil-Dampierre (51619)
 Vienne-la-Ville (51620)
 Vienne-le-Château (51621)
 Villers-en-Argonne (51632)
 Villers-le-Château (51634)
 Ville-sur-Tourbe (51640)
 Virginy (51646)
 Vitry-la-Ville (51648)
 Voilemont (51650)
 Vraux (51656)
 Wargemoulin-Hurlus (51659)

History

The arrondissement of Châlons-en-Champagne was created in 1800. At the April 2017 reorganisation of the arrondissements of Marne, it gained the 67 communes from the former arrondissement of Sainte-Menehould, four communes from the arrondissement of Épernay, one commune from the arrondissement of Reims and three communes from the arrondissement of Vitry-le-François, and it lost 23 communes to the arrondissement of Épernay and two communes to the arrondissement of Reims.

As a result of the reorganisation of the cantons of France which came into effect in 2015, the borders of the cantons are no longer related to the borders of the arrondissements. The cantons of the arrondissement of Châlons-en-Champagne were, as of January 2015:

 Châlons-en-Champagne-1
 Châlons-en-Champagne-2
 Châlons-en-Champagne-3
 Châlons-en-Champagne-4
 Écury-sur-Coole
 Marson
 Suippes
 Vertus

References

Chalons-en-Champagne